Carel Pieter Cronje de Wet (25 May 1924 – 22 May 2004) was a South African politician, doctor, diplomat, and member of the National Party.
De Wet was mayor for Vanderbijlpark and MP of that town, then MP for Johannesburg West, and was also an Ambassador.

Life
Dr. Carel de Wet was born in Memel, Orange Free State Province (Now Free State). He was the grandson of Boer general Christiaan Rudolf de Wet, born 2 years after his death. He married Rina Maas in 1949 and they both had 4 children together. He was a Wits University Medical School graduate.

Political Career
De Wet was elected mayor of Vanderbijlpark in 1950 and became MP for that town in 1953 until 1964, in that same year, he succeeded Hilgard Muller as South African Ambassador in London, at 39, he was the youngest South African ambassador, later he would become MP for West Johannesburg in 1967. He was minister of Planning, Health, and Mines, until, on May 12, 1970, Prime Minister John Vorster, transferred his planning portfolio, though he still remained minister of Health and Mines.

References

1924 births
2004 deaths
Ambassadors of South Africa to the United Kingdom
Afrikaner people
National Party (South Africa) politicians
South African diplomats
University of the Witwatersrand alumni